William, Will or Bill Coleman may refer to:

Business
 William Tell Coleman (1824–1893), American pioneer and businessman
 William Coffin Coleman (1870–1957), founder of the Coleman Company
 William T. Coleman III, CEO of Veritas
 William Frank Kobina Coleman, Ghanaian engineer and director-general of the Ghana Broadcasting Corporation
 William C. Coleman (1901–1976), US railroad executive

Entertainment
 Bill Coleman (trumpeter) (1904–1981), jazz trumpeter
 Bill Coleman (artist) (1922–1993), Australian artist
 William Stephen Coleman (1829–1904), English painter and book illustrator
 Will Coleman (storyteller) Cornish film-maker, author, and musician

Politics
 William Coleman (politician) (1878–?), house painter, labor activist, and Socialist politician from Milwaukee
 William D. Coleman (politician) (1842–1908), president of Liberia
 William Henry Coleman (1871–1943), Republican member of the U.S. House of Representatives from Pennsylvania
 William Thaddeus Coleman Jr. (1920–2017), U.S. Secretary of Transportation
 Bill Coleman (Oklahoma politician), member of the Oklahoma Senate

Religion
 Bill Coleman (bishop) (1917–1992), Anglican bishop in Canada
 William D. Coleman (pastor) (1915–2001), first principal of the Andhra Christian Theological College, Hyderabad
 William Emmette Coleman (1843–1909), American clerk, Orientalist, spiritualist and writer

Sports
 Will Coleman (American football) (1869–1934), American football coach at the University of Kansas
 William Coleman (basketball) (born 1988), American basketball player
 William Coleman (equestrian) (born 1983), American equestrian

Other
 William Coleman (judge) (1704–1769), judge in colonial Philadelphia, Pennsylvania
 William Caldwell Coleman (1884–1968), American federal judge
 William Coleman (editor) (1766–1829), first editor of the New York Evening Post
 William Coleman (historian) (1934–1988), American historian of biology
 William Higgins Coleman (1812–1863), English botanist
 William Thaddeus Coleman III (born 1947), General Counsel of the U.S. Army
 William D. Coleman (scientist), Canadian political science professor
 William Peter Coleman (1928–2019), Australian writer and politician
 William B. Coleman, prisoner who carried out hunger strike which led to the Lantz v. Coleman case addressing the constitutionality of force-feeding

See also
William Coleman Anderson (1853–1902), American Republican politician
SS William T. Coleman, 1942 Liberty ship